Juan Fernando Cordero Cueva (born May 27, 1952 in Cuenca) is an Ecuadorian politician and architect. He was the mayor of Cuenca between 1996 and 2005. He was also Member of the Ecuadorian Congress and President of the Ecuadorian Constituent Assembly in 2008. Between 2009 and 2013 he was President of the National Assembly. From September 2014 to March 2016 he was Minister of National Defence. He is also publicly known as Corcho Cordero.

Career
Cordero was born 1952 in Cuenca the son of Leonardo Cordero Vega and his wife, Beatriz Cueva Jaramillo. His maternal grandfather was the recognized politician Carlos Cueva Tamaríz.

Cordero studied architecture at the University of Cuenca, of which he later served as dean from 1989–1991 and 1994-1996. He graduated 1975, absolved a post-gradual program in Brasil until 1977 and obtained later a Master's degree in Urbanism at the Complutense University of Madrid in 2007. He has been a professor at his alma mater since 1977 and has been involved in international architectural organizations such as  Sociedad Interamericana de Planificación. He was elected mayor of Cuenca in 1996 and was reelected for a second term in 2000. As such he won 2004 a prize for the best work as mayor in Ecuador among 22 participants. 2006 Cueva was elected member of the Ecuadorian Congress as the most voted candidate in the country and 2007 of the Ecuadorian Constituent Assembly.

Cordero Cueva was later elected President of the National Assembly, and was appointed Minister of National Defense on September 26, 2014, a position he served through March 1, 2016. He succeeded María Fernanda Espinosa, and was himself succeeded by Ricardo Patiño.

Cordero Cueva is married to Nelly Carvallo and has three children.

External links
 Fernando Cordero at the Website of the Ecuadorian Constituent Assembly
 Official Website

References

1952 births
Living people
Complutense University of Madrid alumni
Defence ministers of Ecuador
Academic staff of the University of Cuenca
Ecuadorian architects
Mayors of places in Ecuador
Members of the National Congress (Ecuador)
Members of the Ecuadorian Constituent Assembly (2007–2008)
Members of the first National Assembly (Ecuador)
PAIS Alliance politicians
People from Cuenca, Ecuador
Presidents of the National Assembly (Ecuador)
Members of the Latin American Parliament